Bruno Kernen (born 25 March 1961) is a former Swiss World Cup alpine ski racer, winner of the Kitzbühel downhill race in January 1983.

Born in Schönried, Bern, he currently runs a hotel in his hometown with his family.

References

External links
 
 Bruno Kernen's Hotel Bahnhof Homepage

Swiss male alpine skiers
1961 births
Living people
Sportspeople from the canton of Bern
20th-century Swiss people